Oreina gloriosa is a species of broad-shouldered leaf beetles of the family Chrysomelidae, subfamily Chrysomelinae.

This alpine leaf beetle is found in France, Italy, Germany, Switzerland and Austria.

The only food plant for both adults and larvae is the Masterwort (Peucedanum ostruthium in the family Apiaceae). Elytra are bright metallic green crossed by longitudinal blue stripes, or metallic blue.

References
 Bontems, C., 1981 - Les especes de Linne et Fabricius du genre Oreina Chevrolat, 1837 (Col. Chrysomelidae, Chrysomelinae) - Nouv. Rev. Ent. 11: 93-109

External links
 Biolib
 Fauna Europaea

Chrysomelinae
Beetles of Europe
Beetles described in 1781
Taxa named by Johan Christian Fabricius